Ross MacGibbon (born 29 January 1955) is a British former ballet dancer, and now a film maker, especially for ballet and opera.

Ross MacGibbon danced with the Royal Ballet from 1973-86.

MacGibbon's won the 1998 International Emmy Award for his film of Kenneth MacMillan's final ballet, The Judas Tree.

References

External links
 

British male ballet dancers
British filmmakers
Living people
1955 births